The 1884 United States presidential election in Tennessee took place on November 4, 1884, as part of the 1884 United States presidential election. Tennessee voters chose twelve representatives, or electors, to the Electoral College, who voted for president and vice president.

Background and vote
For over a century after the Civil War, Tennessee’s white citizenry was divided according to partisan loyalties established in that war. Unionist regions covering almost all of East Tennessee, Kentucky Pennyroyal-allied Macon County, and the five West Tennessee Highland Rim counties of Carroll, Henderson, McNairy, Hardin and Wayne voted Republican – generally by landslide margins – as they saw the Democratic Party as the “war party” who had forced them into a war they did not wish to fight. Contrariwise, the rest of Middle and West Tennessee who had supported and driven the state’s secession was equally fiercely Democratic as it associated the Republicans with Reconstruction. After the state’s white landowning class re-established its rule in the early 1870s, blacks and Unionist whites nonetheless forged adequate support for the GOP to produce a competitive political system for two decades, although during this era the Republicans could only capture statewide offices when the Democratic Party was divided on this issue of payment of state debt.

White Democrats in West Tennessee were always aiming to eliminate black political influence, and during the 1880s they attempted to do this by election fraud and stuffing of ballot boxes. However, at this stage the Republican Party was a strong force throughout the state and the Democratic Party had not yet achieved a monopoly in power in secessionist areas, with its statewide vote not rising above sixty percent in any year’s congressional race.

Tennessee was won by the Democratic nominees, Governor Grover Cleveland of New York and his running mate former Senator and Governor Thomas A. Hendricks of Indiana. Cleveland and Hendricks defeated the Republican nominees, former Secretary of State and Senator James G. Blaine of Maine and his running mate Senator John A. Logan of Illinois, with 51.45% of the vote.

Results

Results by county

References 

Tennessee
1884
1884 Tennessee elections